Emergency Broadcast is the fifth album by the Christian rock band White Heart and the band's first with bass guitarist Tommy Sims and is the second album on the Sparrow Records label released in late 1987. The album track "No Taboo" features the vocals of Rick Florian, Mark Gersmehl, Gordon Kennedy and Sims. The album was produced by White Heart, with the executive producer being Randy Moore. Emergency Broadcast peaked at number 6 on the Billboard Top Inspirational Albums chart.

Track listing
 "Urban Renewal" (Mark Gersmehl, Billy Smiley) – 4:02 
 "Key to Our Survival" (Gordon Kennedy, Tommy Sims) – 4:19
 "No Taboo" (Gersmehl, Smiley, Rick Florian) – 4:46	
 "Montana Sky" (Gersmehl, Kennedy, Smiley) – 4:55
 "Fashion Fades" (Gersmehl, Kennedy, Smiley) – 4:19
 "More Sold Out" (Kennedy, Smiley) – 4:41
 "Somewhere in Between" (Gersmehl, Smiley) – 4:04
 "Speed of Sound" (Kennedy) – 3:03 
 "Lone Ranger" (Sims, Smiley) – 4:07
 "Edge of the Dream" (Gersmehl) – 4:34

Personnel 

White Heart
 Rick Florian – lead vocals (1, 2, 3, 5–9), backing vocals
 Mark Gersmehl – keyboards, backing vocals, additional lead vocals (3), lead vocals (10)
 Gordon Kennedy – lead and rhythm guitars, backing vocals, additional lead vocals (3), lead vocals (4)
 Billy Smiley – rhythm guitar (1), backing vocals 
 Tommy Sims – bass guitar, synthesizer bass, keyboards, backing vocals, additional lead vocals (3)
 Chris McHugh – drums, percussion

Additional musicians
 Carl Marsh – Fairlight programming (3, 4, 9)
 David Mullen – backing vocals (1, 3)

Production 
 Randy Moore – executive producer 
 White Heart – producers, arrangements 
 Scott Hendricks – vocal production assistant, vocal engineer 
 Jeff Balding – recording, mixing 
 Bill Deaton – engineer (guitar overdubs)
 Bill Whittington – engineer (keyboard overdubs)
 Danny Johnson – second engineer
 Jeanne Kinney – second engineer
 Dave Parker – second engineer
 Brent King – additional engineer
 Denny Purcell – mastering 
 Barbara Catanzaro-Hearn – art direction 
 Steven A. Heller – cover photography 
 5 Penguins Design – design 
 Ron Mazellan – illustration 

Studios
 Center Stage Studio, Nashville, Tennessee – recording location
 OmniSound Studios, Nashville, Tennessee – recording location
 Sixteenth Avenue Sound, Nashville, Tennessee – mixing location
 Georgetown Masters, Nashville, Tennessee – mastering location

Charts

Radio singles

References

1987 albums
White Heart albums